Malik Asad Sikandar (born 1 January 1969) is a Pakistani politician who had been a member of the National Assembly of Pakistan, from June 2013 to May 2018.

Early life
He was born on 1 January 1969.

Political career

He served as district nazim Jamshoro.

He was elected to the National Assembly of Pakistan as a candidate of Pakistan Peoples Party (PPP) from Constituency NA-231 (Jamshoro) in 2013 Pakistani general election. He received 129,500 votes and defeated Syed Jalal Mehmood Shah.

He was re-elected to Provincial Assembly of Sindh as a candidate of PPP from Constituency PS-82 (Jamshoro-III) in 2018 Pakistani general election.

References

Living people
Pakistan People's Party MPAs (Sindh)
Sindhi people
Pakistani MNAs 2013–2018
People from Sindh
1969 births
Sindh MPAs 2018–2023